Hackney South was a parliamentary constituency in "The Metropolis" (later the  County of London). It was represented by nine Members of Parliament to the House of Commons of the Parliament of the United Kingdom, only two of whom, Horatio Bottomley and Herbert Morrison, were elected more than once.

History 
The constituency was created under the Redistribution of Seats Act, 1885 when the two-member Parliamentary Borough of Hackney was split into three single-member divisions. The seat, officially the Southern Division of the Parliamentary Borough of Hackney was first contested at the 1885 general election. The constituency was abolished in 1955.

Boundaries

1885–1918
In 1885 the constituency was defined as consisting of:
No. 7 or South Hackney Ward of Hackney Parish
No. 6 or Homerton Ward of Hackney Parish
The part of the No. 5 or Hackney Ward of Hackney Parish south of the centres of Everning Road, Upper Clapton Road, and the Upper and Lower Clapton Roads.

1918–1950
The Representation of the People Act 1918 redrew constituencies throughout Great Britain and Ireland. Seats in the County of London were redefined in terms of wards of the Metropolitan Boroughs that had been created in 1900. The Metropolitan Borough of Hackney was divided into three divisions, with the same names as the constituencies created in 1885. Hackney South was defined as consisting of:

Homerton Ward
South Hackney Ward
The part of Clapton Park Ward to the south of a line drawn along the centres of Glenarm Road, Glyn Road and Redwald Road to its junction with Maclaren Street, thence across the recreation grounds in Daubeney Road to the borough boundary at a point fifty feet north of a boundary post situate at the junction of the Waterworks River with the River Lea at Lead Mill Point.

1950–1955
Under the Representation of the People Act 1948 the Boroughs of Hackney and Stoke Newington jointly formed two seats, the borough constituencies of Stoke Newington and Hackney North and Hackney South. Hackney South was enlarged: consisting of the Metropolitan Borough of Hackney except the five wards of Leaside, Maury, Southwold, Springfield and Stamford.

Redistribution
Following a review of constituencies by the Boundary Commission appointed under the House of Commons (Redistribution of Seats) Act 1949, parliamentary seats in the metropolitan boroughs of Bethnal Green, Hackney and Stoke Newington were redrawn. The Hackney South constituency was abolished, with most passing to a new Hackney Central borough constituency, and some parts to Bethnal Green.

Members of Parliament

Elections

Elections in the 1880s 

Russell was appointed Attorney General for England and Wales, requiring a by-election.

Elections in the 1890s 

Russell is appointed Attorney General for England and Wales, requiring a by-election.

Russell is appointed Lord of Appeal in Ordinary, becoming Lord Russell of Killowen, causing a by-election.

Elections in the 1900s

Elections in the 1910s 

Roberts was nominated by a breakaway local Liberal Association opposed to Bottomley, which was recognised by the London Liberal Federation.

Elections in the 1920s 

:

:

Elections in the 1930s 

General Election 1939–40

Another General Election was required to take place before the end of 1940. The political parties had been making preparations for an election to take place and by the Autumn of 1939, the following candidates had been selected; 
Labour: Herbert Morrison
Liberal National:

Elections in the 1940s

Elections in the 1950s

References

Sources 

Parliamentary constituencies in London (historic)
Constituencies of the Parliament of the United Kingdom established in 1885
Constituencies of the Parliament of the United Kingdom disestablished in 1955
Parliamentary constituencies in the London Borough of Hackney